Ernest le Pelley, 16th Seigneur of Sark (1801–1849) was Seigneur of Sark from 1839 to 1849. In 1844, desperate for funds to continue the operation of the silver mine on the island, he obtained crown permission to mortgage the Fief of Sark for £4,000 to John Allaire, a local privateer. In 1845 the ceiling of the mine's deepest gallery collapsed. The company was uninsured for this, and was finally closed in 1847. Le Pelley's heir, Pierre Carey le Pelley was unable to keep up his mortgage payments and was forced to sell the seigneurie of Sark to Marie Collings, John Allaire's daughter and heiress, for £6,000.

References

1801 births
1849 deaths
Seigneurs of Sark
Ernest